This is a list of the 7 delegates of the European Parliament from Slovenia.

 Mihael Brejc (SDS, EPP-ED)
 Ljubo Germič (LDS, ELDR)
 Feri Horvat (SD, PES)
 Roman Jakič (LDS, ELDR)
 Lojze Peterle (NSi, EPP-ED)
 Janez Podobnik (SLS, EPP-ED)
 Majda Širca (LDS, ELDR)

References 

Lists of Members of the European Parliament for Slovenia
Lists of Members of the European Parliament 1999–2004